Mario Suárez may refer to:

 Mario Suárez (writer) (1925–1998), Chicano writer
 Mario Suárez (singer) (1926–2018), Venezuelan folk singer
 Mario Suárez (footballer) (born 1987), Spanish footballer